The Model 100ATR is a bolt-action rifle from O.F. Mossberg & Sons. ATR stands for "all-terrain rifle".

The ATR is available in .243 Winchester, .270 Winchester, 7mm-08 Remington, .308 Winchester, .30-06 Springfield. It has a 4+1 round capacity. It currently features camouflage stocks as well as synthetic and walnut. The stock has classic lines. It also features a floating fluted barrel.

ATR Night Train
The tactical version of the ATR rifle, it is chambered in .308 Winchester and features a black synthetic stock as well as a bipod, 10 round detachable magazine, muzzle brake, and high powered scope.

4X4 rifle
The 4x4 has built on the success of the original design.  It offers a wide variety of calibers from 22-250 all the way up to 338 Winchester Magnum.  Its features include a free-floating fluted barrel, muzzle brake, detachable magazine, and vented stock.

MVP rifle
The newest addition to Mossberg's rifle line, it is meant to work with after-market AR magazines and is chambered in 5.56 NATO, versus standard .223 Remington, in order for customers to take advantage of surplus 5.56 NATO ammo which varies slightly from factory .223 Rem rounds. There is also a 7.62×51mm NATO (.308) chambered offering for all four models (Predator, Varmint, Patrol, and Flex).  The 7.62 variant takes M1a, M14, and SR-25 pattern magazines.

MVP stands for Mossberg Varmint Predator.  It comes with various options such as a bipod,2 different model of scopes, and has four stock styles. The predator models come with either an 18" sporter or 20" heavy barrel while the varmint model has a 24" heavy barrel, all are fluted as is the bolt within the action. The varmint model has a very well constructed benchrest style stock, while the predator models have a more sporter style stock.

See also 
 BMS Cam rifle
 Remington Model 7615
 Ruger American Rifle

References

100ATR
Bolt-action rifles of the United States